Two's Company is an album by pianist Joe Albany and bassist Niels-Henning Ørsted Pedersen recorded in 1974 and released on the SteepleChase label.

Reception
The Allmusic review awarded the album 4 stars stating "This duet set with bassist Niels-Henning Orsted Pedersen finds Albany in particularly good form on six veteran standards ...His lyrical and boppish style was still very much intact and Albany is heard in prime form on the thoughtful yet swinging set". The Penguin Guide to Jazz expressed a preference for this album over Birdtown Birds, but wrote that "Albany often sounds less radical than merely clumsy and the solo passages are rife with misfingerings".

Track listing
 "Out of Nowhere" (Johnny Green, Edward Heyman) - 5:29
 "What's New?" (Bob Haggart, Jonny Burke) - 9:06
 "Lullaby in Rhythm" (Clarence Profit, Edgar Sampson) - 4:47
 "Lover Man" (Jimmy Davis, Ram Ramirez, James Sherman) - 6:49
 "If You Could See Me Now" (Tadd Dameron, Carl Sigman) - 7:08
 "Star Eyes" (Gene de Paul, Don Raye) - 5:45

Personnel
Joe Albany - piano
Niels-Henning Ørsted Pedersen - bass

References

Joe Albany albums
Niels-Henning Ørsted Pedersen albums
1974 albums
SteepleChase Records albums
Instrumental duet albums
Collaborative albums